Olegonegrobovia is a genus of flies in the family Dolichopodidae, known from Africa. It is named after the Russian entomologist Oleg Negrobov. It was synonymised with Teuchophorus by Meuffels & Grootaert in 2004, but is considered a separate genus by Grichanov & Mostovski (2008).

Species
 Olegonegrobovia barkalovi Grichanov, 1995
 Olegonegrobovia couturieri Grichanov, 2000
 Olegonegrobovia daugeroni Grichanov, 2000
 Olegonegrobovia longicauda Grichanov, 2000
 Olegonegrobovia pappi Grichanov, 1996
 Olegonegrobovia zlobini Grichanov, 1995

References

Dolichopodidae genera
Sympycninae
Diptera of Africa